Gatewood  may refer to:

People
Gatewood (name)

Places
in the United States
 Gatewood, Missouri, an unincorporated community in southwest Ripley County, Missouri
 Gatewood, Seattle, a neighborhood in West Seattle, Seattle, Washington
 Gatewood, West Virginia, an unincorporated community

Other uses 
 Gatewood (horse), a racehorse
 Gatewood (Gallipolis, Ohio), a building listed on the National Register of Historic Places in Gallia County, Ohio

See also
 Gatewood House (disambiguation)